Jack Thomas Nowell (born 11 April 1993) is an English professional rugby union player for Premiership side Exeter Chiefs. He also represents England. His position of choice is wing but he can also play as a Full-Back or Outside Centre. But he isn’t good at inside centre , he’s like a Cornishman’s rip off of manu tuilangi

Exeter Chiefs
Nowell was originally a product of the Cornish Pirates junior section. He went to school at Mounts Bay Academy, Heamoor and then Truro College, where he took a BTEC in Sport Performance and Excellence. On 25 November 2012 he made his Premiership debut for Exeter Chiefs in a 27–23 win over London Irish. After establishing himself as a regular in the Chiefs first team, Nowell was nominated for, and won, the LV=Breakthrough Player Award for the 2012–13 season.

In May 2016 Nowell was part of the Exeter side that reached their first ever Premiership final, after finishing second in the overall table and winning a home semi-final against Wasps. Despite Nowell scoring a try in the final they had to settle for runners up to Saracens. The following season saw Nowell again record a try in the league final as Exeter overcame Wasps in extra-time to claim their maiden Premiership title.

Nowell started in the 2020 European Rugby Champions Cup Final as Exeter beat Racing to become champions of Europe for the first time. 
The following weekend saw Exeter defeat Wasps in the Premiership final to complete a league and European double.

International career

England
In the summer of 2011 Nowell was a member of the England under-18 team that toured Australia. He was part of the England national under-20 side that retained the 2013 Six Nations Under 20s Championship. Nowell was selected for the 2013 IRB Junior World Championship and scored a try in the final of the competition as England defeated Wales to become junior world champions for the first time. Later that year he was included in the England A squad on the advice of chief scout Andy Fairley.

In January 2014 Nowell received his first call-up to the senior England squad by coach Stuart Lancaster for the 2014 Six Nations Championship. On 1 February 2014 he made his debut for England in their opening round 26–24 defeat to France. He scored his first international try during their last round victory over Italy. He also played in the 2015 Six Nations Championship and scored his first international try at Twickenham in the penultimate round against Scotland. In the final game of the tournament against France, England required a winning margin of at least 27 points to clinch the title. Despite Nowell scoring two tries, England failed to achieve this target and finished runners up to Ireland. Nowell was included in the squad for the 2015 Rugby World Cup. His only appearance in the tournament saw him score three tries in their final pool fixture against Uruguay as the hosts failed to make the knockout phase. He is one of only six players to have scored a hat-trick of tries at a Rugby World Cup for England.

New head coach Eddie Jones selected Nowell for the 2016 Six Nations Championship and he scored a try in their opening game against Scotland. He started all five games during the tournament including the final match as England defeated France to achieve their first Grand Slam in over a decade. Later that year he scored a try off the bench in the opening game of their 2016 tour of Australia and started the next two tests as England completed a series whitewash. The following year saw Nowell score two tries against Italy in the 2017 Six Nations. He also featured off the bench in the final game of the competition as England missed out on a consecutive grand slam with defeat away to Ireland which also brought an end to a record equalling eighteen successive Test victories.

Nowell scored a try in a draw with Scotland in the final game of the 2019 Six Nations. He was a member of the England squad that finished runners up at the 2019 Rugby World Cup however injury restricted him to only one appearance in the tournament which saw him come off the bench to score against Argentina during the pool stage. After the world cup he did not play for England again until the 2022 Six Nations.

British and Irish Lions
In April 2017, Nowell was called up for the 2017 British & Irish Lions tour to New Zealand, becoming the first player to be selected from Exeter Chiefs by the Lions. After missing the first test, Nowell featured as a replacement in both the second and third tests as the series finished level.

International tries

Honours
England
 Six Nations Championship: 2016, 2017
 Rugby World Cup runner-up: 2019

Exeter
 European Rugby Champions Cup: 2019–2020
 Premiership: 2016–17, 2019–20

References

External links

Exeter Chiefs profile

Career statistics at Statbunker

1993 births
Living people
People from Newlyn
English rugby union players
England international rugby union players
Rugby union fullbacks
Rugby union wings
Exeter Chiefs players
British & Irish Lions rugby union players from England
Rugby union players from Cornwall